Dəyəqarabulaq (also, Dəyərqarabulaq, Dayakarabulag, and Dayakarabulak) is a village and municipality in the Gadabay Rayon of Azerbaijan.  It has a population of 2,016.  The municipality consists of the villages of Dəyəqarabulaq, Musayal, and Günəşli (formerly, Şurakənd).

References 

Populated places in Gadabay District